Euhesma is a genus within the bee family Colletidae found in Australia. There are over 90 species described. The group lacks strong unifying features and maybe further split in the future. The type species is Euhesma wahlenbergiae.

Species
The following list is of valid names given at ITIS, citing the Australian Faunal Directory:

Subgenus Euhesma (Euhesma) Michener, 1965 
 Euhesma acantha Exley, 2004 	 
 Euhesma albamala Hogendoorn & Leijs, 2015
 Euhesma alicia (Exley, 1998) 	 
 Euhesma allunga Exley, 2001 	 
 Euhesma altitudinis (Cockerell, 1914) 	 
 Euhesma anthracocephala (Cockerell, 1914) 	 
 Euhesma atra (Exley, 1998) 	 
 Euhesma aulaca Hogendoorn & Leijs, 2015
 Euhesma aurata (Exley, 1998) 	 
 Euhesma aureophila (Houston, 1992) 	 
 Euhesma australis (Michener, 1965) 	 
 Euhesma balladonia (Exley, 1998) 	 
 Euhesma banksia Exley, 2001 	 
 Euhesma bronzus Exley, 2001 	 
 Euhesma collaris Exley, 2004 	 
 Euhesma coppinensis (Exley, 1998) 	 
 Euhesma crabronica (Cockerell, 1914) 	 
 Euhesma cuneifolia (Exley, 1998) 	 
 Euhesma dolichocephala (Rayment, 1953) 	 
 Euhesma dongara Exley, 2001 	 
 Euhesma evansi Exley, 2002 	 
 Euhesma fasciatella (Cockerell, 1907) 	 
 Euhesma filicis (Cockerell, 1926) 	 
 Euhesma flavocuneata (Cockerell, 1915) 	 
 Euhesma goodeniae (Cockerell, 1926) 	 
 Euhesma granitica (Exley, 1998) 	 
 Euhesma halictina (Cockerell, 1920) 	 
 Euhesma hemichlora (Cockerell, 1914) 	 
 Euhesma hemixantha (Cockerell, 1914) 	 
 Euhesma hyphesmoides (Michener, 1965) 	 
 Euhesma inconspicua (Cockerell, 1913) 	 
 Euhesma latissima (Cockerell, 1914) 	 
 Euhesma leonora (Exley, 1998) 	 
 Euhesma lobata Exley, 2001 	 
 Euhesma loorea Exley, 2004 	 
 Euhesma lucida Exley, 2002 	 
 Euhesma lutea (Rayment, 1934) 	 
 Euhesma lyngouriae Hogendoorn & Leijs, 2015
 Euhesma macrayae (Exley, 1998) 	 
 Euhesma maculifera (Michener, 1965) 	 
 Euhesma malaris (Michener, 1965) 	 
 Euhesma maura (Cockerell, 1927) 	 
 Euhesma meeka (Exley, 1998) 	 
 Euhesma melanosoma (Cockerell, 1914) 	 
 Euhesma micans Hogendoorn & Leijs, 2015
 Euhesma morrisoni (Houston, 1992) 	 
 Euhesma nalbarra (Exley, 1998) 	 
 Euhesma neglectula (Cockerell, 1905) 	 
 Euhesma newmanensis (Exley, 1998) 	 
 Euhesma nitidifrons (Smith, 1879) 	 
 Euhesma nubifera (Cockerell, 1922) 	 
 Euhesma palpalis (Michener, 1965) 	 
 Euhesma pantoni (Exley, 1998) 	 
 Euhesma perditiformis (Cockerell, 1910) 	 
 Euhesma perkinsi (Michener, 1965) 	 
 Euhesma pernana (Cockerell, 1905) 	 
 Euhesma platyrhina (Cockerell, 1915) 	 
 Euhesma rainbowi (Cockerell, 1929) 	 
 Euhesma ricae (Rayment, 1948) 	 
 Euhesma ridens (Cockerell, 1913) 	 
 Euhesma rufiventris (Michener, 1965) 	 
 Euhesma scoparia (Exley, 1998) 	 
 Euhesma semaphore (Houston, 1992) 	 
 Euhesma serrata (Cockerell, 1927) 	 
 Euhesma spinola Exley, 2001 	 
 Euhesma sturtiensis (Exley, 1998) 	 
 Euhesma subinconspicua (Rayment, 1934) 	 
 Euhesma sulcata (Exley, 1998) 	 
 Euhesma sybilae Exley, 2001 	 
 Euhesma symmetra (Exley, 1998) 	 
 Euhesma tasmanica (Cockerell, 1918) 	 
 Euhesma thala Exley, 2002 	 
 Euhesma tuberculata (Rayment, 1939) 	 
 Euhesma tubulifera (Houston, 1983) 	 
 Euhesma undeneya Exley, 2002 	 
 Euhesma undulata (Cockerell, 1914) 	 
 Euhesma viridescens Exley, 2001 	 
 Euhesma wahlenbergiae (Michener, 1965) 	 
 Euhesma walkeri (Exley, 1998) 	 
 Euhesma walkeriana (Cockerell, 1905) 	 
 Euhesma wiluna (Exley, 1998) 	 
 Euhesma wowine Exley, 2002 	 
 Euhesma xana Exley, 2001 	 
 Euhesma yeatsi Exley, 2002 	 
 Euhesma yellowdinensis (Exley, 1998)

Subgenus Euhesma (Parahesma) Michener, 1965
 Euhesma tuberculipes (Michener, 1965)

Incertae Sedis (uncertain placement)
 Euhesma catanii (Rayment, 1949) 	 
 Euhesma endeavouricola (Strand, 1921) 	 
 Euhesma tarsata (Alfken, 1907)

References

Colletidae
Bee genera
Hymenoptera of Australia